The 2012–13 season is Ipswich Town's eleventh consecutive season in the Football League Championship, the second-highest division in the English football league system.  In addition to competing in the Championship, Ipswich Town also competed in the League Cup and the FA Cup.

First-team squad

Out on loan

Under-23 squad

First-team coaching staff
Until 24 October:

From 1 November:

Pre-season

Competitions

Football League Championship

League table

Results summary

Results by round

Matches

August

September

October

November

December

January

February

March

April

May

FA Cup

Football League Cup

Transfers

Transfers in

Loans in

Transfers out

Loans out

Squad statistics
All statistics updated as of end of season

Appearances and goals

|-
! colspan=14 style=background:#dcdcdc; text-align:center| Goalkeepers

|-
! colspan=14 style=background:#dcdcdc; text-align:center| Defenders

|-
! colspan=14 style=background:#dcdcdc; text-align:center| Midfielders

|-
! colspan=14 style=background:#dcdcdc; text-align:center| Forwards

|-
! colspan=14 style=background:#dcdcdc; text-align:center|Players transferred out during the season

Goalscorers

Clean sheets

Disciplinary record

Starting 11
Considering starts in all competitions

Awards

Player awards

References

2012-13
2012–13 Football League Championship by team